Frank J. Fiorenzano (born January 7, 1949) is an American Democratic Party politician who served as a member of the Rhode Island House of Representatives from 1977 to 1993. He did not seek reelection in 1992 after being charged with stealing from clients and was replaced by his wife, Charlene Lima.

References 

Democratic Party members of the Rhode Island House of Representatives
1949 births
Living people
20th-century American politicians